The Sri Lankan cricket team toured New Zealand for cricket matches during the 2006–07 cricket season. It was the third successive season Sri Lanka visited New Zealand, after the 2005–06 tour was aborted and reschuled for the winter of 2005–06. Originally, the tour had been set to include three Tests and five One Day Internationals, but New Zealand Cricket chief executive Martin Snedden announced in June that one of the Tests would be replaced with two Twenty20 Internationals.

Sri Lanka lost their ODI series 1–4 and the Test series 0–2 the last time they visited New Zealand, but beat New Zealand at the 2006 Champions Trophy. However, that was their only victory in the group stage, as New Zealand progressed from the group. On the ICC Test Championship tables, Sri Lanka were ranked two places ahead of New Zealand, but New Zealand were ranked third on the ODI tables, three places ahead of Sri Lanka.

Schedule

The schedule was announced on 22 June.

Squads

First-class matches

Tour Match: Otago v Sri Lankans, 30 November–3 December

Match drawn

At Dunedin, Sri Lanka passed 400 twice, with Upul Tharanga making the highest score of the match with 108 in the third innings. For Otago, Jordan Sheed, Craig Cumming and Aaron Redmond all passed 50, and the remaining eight batsmen contributed 86 runs to the total in the first innings. Lasith Malinga took three wickets, with wicket-keeper Gareth Hopkins the highest-batting, and no-balled 11 times.

First Test: New Zealand v Sri Lanka, 7 December–9 December

Shane Bond took three wickets in his first six overs in his first Test match for a year, and Sri Lanka were bowled out for 154 with only Tharanga and Chamara Kapugedera passing 20. In reply, New Zealand trailed by 41 with six wickets in hand, but Daniel Vettori's half-century helped score 206 against a Muttiah Muralitharan-led bowling attack. Murali took four for 65 from 34 overs, while Chaminda Vaas took two wickets in an over and ended with three for 49. The second time around, Kumar Sangakkara made an unbeaten century from number three, out of a total of 170. After completing an easy single to complete Sangakkara's century Muralitharan walked down the pitch to celebrate while the ball was being returned to the wicketkeeper. McCullum then appealed for a runout and Muralitharan was dismissed, ending Sri Lanka's second innings. After the match Jayawardene expressed the Sri Lankan team's disappointment about the incident, saying it was contrary to the spirit of the game, but Fleming and McCullum were unrepentant. New Zealand managed to reach the modest target of 118 to win the game, despite a mini-collapse.

Second Test: New Zealand v Sri Lanka, 15 December–19 December

Kumar Sangakkara and Chamara Silva put on a stand of 121 runs to lift the Sri Lankans to a score of 268 in their first innings after Jayawardene chose to bat. Sangakkara hit 21 4s and one 6 on his way to 156 not out, while Silva scored 61 runs. The only other player for Sri Lanka to get into double figures was Prasanna Jayawardene, while 5 of their players didn't manage to trouble the scorers. At the end of the first day, New Zealand in reply were 64 for 4, still 204 runs behind with Malinga taking 3 scalps.

On the second day, Muralitharan and Malinga shared the remaining 6 wickets of the New Zealand innings, as they were bowled out for 130 before lunch. The second Sri Lankan innings started off shaky, with their first three wickets, including the in-form Sangakkara falling with just 62 runs on the board. Chamara Silva then came to the crease and helped the Sri Lankans to 255 for 5 at the end of the day, with Silva getting to 79 not out at stumps.

The third day belonged to Sri Lanka once more, with Silva reaching 152 not out by the end of the innings, and Chaminda Vaas chipping in with a well made 47. Needing an unlikely 504 runs to win the match, New Zealand lost their openers with just 60 runs scored. On the fourth and final day, the New Zealanders lost five quick wickets falling to 163 for 7, before Vettori and Franklin shared a partnership of 96. After Vettori got out, the New Zealand team lost their way and finished with 286. Sri Lanka won by 217 runs to level the test series 1-1. The player of the match was Chamara Silva after scoring 213 runs in the match.

T20 international series

1st T20I

2nd T20I

ODI series

1st ODI

2nd ODI

3rd ODI

4th ODI

5th ODI

References and notes

2006 in New Zealand cricket
2006 in Sri Lankan cricket
2006–07 New Zealand cricket season
2007 in New Zealand cricket
2007 in Sri Lankan cricket
International cricket competitions in 2006–07
2006-07